The Oborishte locality is a historical place situated at 7 km to the north-west of the town of Panagyurishte, Bulgaria. It is located in the Sredna Gora mountains. In the spring of 1876 the First Great National Assembly took place there. A monument was erected on that place in 1923.

History 

In the course of the preparation of the April Uprising against the Ottoman Empire the representatives of the Fourth Revolutionary District assembled in the forests around the district's headquarters Panagyurishte. The assembly was held between 14 and 16 April (O.S.) 1876. The number of the deputies is unknown, varying according to different sources and studies from 49 to more than 350, from around 50 towns and villages. Headed by Georgi Benkovski the deputies took decision for the Uprising.

Deputies according to different sources:

Honour

Oborishte Ridge on Greenwich Island in the South Shetland Islands, Antarctica is named after the historical site of Oborishte.

Notes

Sources

 
 
 "Оборищенци" (Сборник от исторически очерци за народните представители на Оборище през 1876 година), редакция и съставителство Христо М. Йонков, ДВИ, С., 1972.

External links
 Historical Site Oborishte – Town of Panagyurishte at Bulgariatravel.org - Official Tourism Portal of Bulgaria

Panagyurishte
1876 in Bulgaria